Dov Tzvi Heller (1862 – 1935) commonly called by his Yiddish name, Ber Hirsch Heller, was a rabbi and mashgiach ruchani at the Slabodka Yeshiva in Europe, as well as the father-in-law of Rabbi Yaakov Kamenetzky and Rabbi Avraham Grodzinski.

Life 

Dov Tzvi Heller was born in 1862 in Shilel (Šilalė), Lithuania, then part of the Russian Empire, to Eliezer Yitzchak and Hasseh Gisseh Heller. In 1890, he became the mashgiach ruchani in the Yeshiva Knesses Yisrael Slabodka under Nosson Tzvi Finkel, where he was known for his sweet personality, gentleness, and love of his students, which was so strong, that he would often fast for their success. During World War I, the yeshiva escaped to Minsk, and later many of them Kremenchug, and Heller came with the yeshiva on these travels. Shimon Reuven Dvoretz, who was teenager in Kremenchug, described Heller as "a saint, a Chafetz Chaim in his simplicity," comparing him to Yisrael Meir Kagan, who had been the greatest rabbi of the time until his death a few years prior.

Family 

Heller was married Feiga Esther Heller née Blankfield (c. 1862-1942). They had five children, four of which lived to adulthood (one son and four daughters). Their son was Avraham Meir Heller (1887-1979). Their oldest daughter, Chasya (1891-1944), married Avraham Grodzinski, who later served as mashgiach ruchani of the Slabodka Yeshiva as well. Their second daughter, Ita Ettel (1895-1954), married Yaakov Kamenetzky, a student of her father and Finkel, and future rosh yeshiva of Yeshiva Torah Vodaath. Their third daughter to live adulthood, Sara (1899-1941), married Shabsi Vernokovsky, and they both were murdered in the Holocaust. They had another child, named Kayle, who was born in 1897 and died two years later.

Death 

Heller died in 1935 in Jerusalem.

References 

1862 births
1935 deaths
20th-century Lithuanian rabbis
Haredi rabbis in Europe
Mashgiach ruchani
Lithuanian Haredi rabbis
Academic staff of Slabodka yeshiva
Rabbis from Kaunas
19th-century Lithuanian rabbis